The 1748 Treaty of Aix-la-Chapelle, sometimes called the Treaty of Aachen, ended the War of the Austrian Succession, following a congress assembled on 24 April 1748 at the Free Imperial City of Aachen. 

The two main antagonists in the war, Britain and France, opened peace talks in the Dutch city of Breda in 1746. Agreement was delayed by British hopes of improving their position; when this failed to occur, a draft treaty was agreed on 30 April 1748. A final version was signed on 18 October 1748 by Britain, France, and the Dutch Republic. 

The terms were then presented to the other belligerents, who could either accept them or continue the war on their own. Austria, Spain, and Sardinia had little choice but to comply, and signed separately. Modena and Genoa joined together on 21 January 1749.

The treaty largely failed to resolve the issues that caused the war, while most of the signatories were unhappy with the terms. Maria Theresa resented Austria's exclusion from the talks, and blamed Britain for forcing her to accept concessions, while British politicians felt they had received little benefit for the financial subsidies paid to her. These issues, combined with other factors, led to the strategic realignment known as the Diplomatic Revolution, and the outbreak of the Seven Years' War in 1756.

Background
Franco-British negotiations began at Breda in August 1746 but were deliberately delayed by the Duke of Newcastle, who controlled British foreign policy. The death of Philip V of Spain in July 1746 seemed an opportunity to break the Bourbon alliance, while Newcastle hoped the 1747 Orangist Revolution would revitalise the Dutch war effort, and allow the Allies to recover the Austrian Netherlands. Both assumptions proved incorrect; Spanish policy remained largely unchanged, the Dutch army collapsed, and Newcastle later berated himself for his "ignorance, obstinacy, and credulity".

However, despite French victories in Flanders, the impact of the British naval blockade was such that throughout 1746, Finance Minister Machault repeatedly warned Louis XV of the impending collapse of their financial system. The position became critical after the Second Battle of Cape Finisterre in October 1747, as the French navy was no longer strong enough to protect their merchant convoys. 

Maria Theresa made peace with Bavaria in April 1745, then with Prussia in December; only British financial subsidies kept Austria in the war thereafter. At a conference in December 1747, Austrian ministers agreed 'the worse peace is preferable to starting another campaign', and drew up proposals for ending the stalemate in Italy. They agreed to withdraw Austrian troops from the Duchy of Modena and Republic of Genoa, confirm Spanish control of Naples, and provide territorial concessions that would provide Philip of Spain with an Italian state.

In November, Britain signed a convention with Russia for the supply of troops and in February 1748, a Russian corps of 37,000 arrived in the Rhineland. Lack of progress in Flanders and domestic opposition to the cost of subsidising its allies meant Britain was also ready to end the war. Both France and Britain were prepared to impose terms on their allies if needed, but preferred to avoid dropping them by making a separate peace treaty. 

On 30 April 1748 France, Britain and the Dutch Republic signed a preliminary treaty which included the return of the Austrian Netherlands, the Dutch Barrier forts, Maastricht and Bergen op Zoom. They also guaranteed the Austrian cession of Silesia to Prussia, as well as the Duchies of Parma, and Guastalla to Philip of Spain. Faced with this, Austria, Sardinia, Spain, Modena and Genoa acceded to the treaty in two separate documents finalised on 4 December 1748 and 21 January 1749 respectively.

Terms

These included the following;

 All signatories accept the Pragmatic Sanction of 1713;
 Austria recognises the Prussian acquisition of Silesia
 Austria cedes the Duchies of Parma, Piacenza and Guastalla to Philip of Spain, second eldest son of Philip V of Spain and Elisabeth Farnese;
 Austria cedes minor territories in Italy to Sardinia, including Vigevano;
 Austria withdraws from the Duchy of Modena and Republic of Genoa, which regain their independence; 
 France withdraws from the Austrian Netherlands and returns the Dutch Barrier forts, Maastricht and Bergen op Zoom;
 Britain and France exchange Louisbourg on Île-Royale for Madras in India; 
 Spain renews the Asiento de Negros (a monopoly contract to supply slaves to Spanish America) which was granted to Britain in the 1713 Treaty of Utrecht; Britain subsequently renounced this under the 1750 Treaty of Madrid, in return for £100,000;
 Commission established to resolve competing claims between French and British colonies in North America. France also agrees to expel the Jacobite pretender Charles Edward Stuart.

Aftermath

The terms of the peace largely failed to resolve the issues that caused the war in the first place, while most of the signatories either resented the concessions they made, or felt they had failed to obtain what they were due. These factors led to the diplomatic re-alignment known as the 1756 Diplomatic Revolution, and the subsequent Seven Years' War.

Prussia, which doubled in size and wealth with the acquisition of Silesia, was the most obvious beneficiary, Austria arguably the biggest loser. Maria Theresa did not see acceptance of the Pragmatic Sanction as any kind of concession, while she deeply resented Britain's insistence Austria cede Silesia and the concessions made in Italy. On the other hand, the Habsburgs survived a potentially disastrous crisis, regained the Austrian Netherlands and largely retained their position in Italy. Administrative and financial reforms made it stronger in 1750 than 1740, while its strategic position was strengthened by installing Habsburgs as rulers of key territories in Northwest Germany, the Rhineland and Northern Italy.  

The Spanish considered their territorial gains in Italy inadequate, failed to recover Menorca or Gibraltar, and viewed the reassertion of British commercial rights in the Americas as an insult. Charles Emmanuel III of Sardinia felt he had been promised the Duchy of Parma, but had to content himself with minor cessions from Austria. The war confirmed the decline of the Dutch Republic as a Great Power, and exposed the weakness of their Barrier forts, which proved unable to stand up to modern artillery.

Few Frenchmen understood the desperate financial state that required the return of their gains in the Austrian Netherlands; combined with the lack of tangible benefits for helping Prussia, it led to the phrase "as stupid as the Peace". This view was widely shared; many French statesmen felt Louis XV had panicked, while English writer and politician, Horace Walpole, wrote "wonderful it is...why the French have lost so much blood and treasure to so little purpose". As a result of the Treaty Charles Edward Stuart, the Jacobite Pretender to the thrones of Britain was arrested and exiled from France.

The decline of the Dutch Republic as a military power exposed the vulnerability of Hanover, George II's German possession. In exchange for restoring the Barrier forts, France insisted on the return of Louisbourg, the capture of which in 1745 was one of the few clear British successes of the war. This caused fury in both Britain and America, where it was seen as benefitting the Dutch and Hanover at the expense of the American colonies. 

Lord Sandwich, the lead British negotiator, failed to include the Utrecht terms in the list of Anglo-Spanish agreements renewed in the Preliminaries to the treaty. When he tried to amend the final version, the Spanish refused to approve it, threatening the lucrative import and export trade between the two countries. Since it was equally valuable to the Spanish, they later agreed terms in the October 1750 Treaty of Madrid, but it was another source of popular dissatisfaction with the treaty.  

Austrian resentment of British 'disloyalty' was mirrored in London; many questioned the value of the financial subsidies paid to Vienna, and suggested Prussia as a more suitable ally. In the 1752 Treaty of Aranjuez, Austria, Spain and Sardinia agreed to respect each other's boundaries in Italy, ending conflict in this region for nearly fifty years, and allowing Maria Theresa to focus on Germany. Her determination to regain Silesia, combined with a feeling the Treaty had left many issues unresolved, meant that it was seen as an armistice, not a peace.

The treaty marked the end of First Carnatic War (1746–1748).

References

Sources

Bibliography
 Olson, J.S.; Shadle, R. Historical Dictionary of the British Empire. Greenwood Press. (1996): 1095–1099. .
 Savelle, Max. "Diplomatic Preliminaries of the Seven Years' War in America". Canadian Historical Review. Vol. 20, No. 1 (1939): 17. doi:10.3138/CHR-020-01-04.

External link 

 Original texts of the Treaty of Aachen – Europäische Friedensverträge der Vormoderne – online of the Instituts für Europäische Geschichte Mainz

History of Aachen
Aix-la-Chapelle (1748)
Aix-la-Chapelle (1748)
Aix-la-Chapelle (1748)
Aix-la-Chapelle (1748)
Aix-la-Chapelle (1748)
Aix-la-Chapelle (1748)
Aix-la-Chapelle (1748)
Aix-la-Chapelle (1748)
Aix-la-Chapelle (1748)
Aix-la-Chapelle (1748)
Aix-la-Chapelle (1748)
1748 treaties
1748 in Austria
1748 in the Holy Roman Empire
1748 in the Habsburg monarchy
1748 in the Dutch Republic
1748 in France
1748 in Great Britain
1748 in Spain
1748 in the Kingdom of Sardinia
1748 in the Republic of Genoa